The Mistatikamekw River is a tributary of the Oskélanéo River which flows into the South Bay of Bureau Lake (Gouin Reservoir), flowing into the town of La Tuque, in the
administrative region of Mauricie, in Quebec, in Canada.

The Mistatikamekw river flows successively into the townships of Tassé, Montpetit, Faucher and Achintre. Forestry is the main economic activity of this valley; recreational tourism  activities, second.

The route 404, connecting the village of Clova, Quebec with the South Bay of Bureau Lake (Gouin Reservoir) also serves the upper part of the river Wistatikamekw; this road connects to the south-east the route 400 which goes to Gouin Dam. Some secondary forest roads are in use nearby for forestry and recreational tourism activities.

The surface of the Mistatikamekw River is usually frozen from mid-November to the end of April, however, safe ice circulation is generally from early December to late March.

Geography

Toponymy 
The hydronym "Mistatikamekw" is of autochthonous origin.

The toponym "Mistatikamekw River" was formalized on September 3, 1981 at the Commission de toponymie du Quebec.

Notes and references

See also 

Rivers of Mauricie
Tributaries of the Saint-Maurice River
La Tuque, Quebec